Lake Yessey is a large freshwater lake in Evenkiysky District, Krasnoyarsk Krai, north-central part of Russia.

The lake is located in the Central Siberian Plateau, to the west of the course of the Kotuy river. A tributary of the Kotuy flows out of the southern end of the lake.

Fauna
The lake is rich in fish. The endangered Lake Yessey Char, Salvelinus tolmachoffi, is found in the waters of the lake.

See also 
List of lakes of Russia

References

Yessey
Central Siberian Plateau
Evenkiysky District